Herbert Patrick Esse (14 May 1920 – 11 April 2000) was an Australian rules footballer who played with Footscray in the Victorian Football League (VFL).

Esse served in both the Australian Army and the Royal Australian Air Force during World War II.

Notes

External links 
		

1920 births
2000 deaths
Australian rules footballers from Melbourne
Western Bulldogs players
West Footscray Football Club players
People from Footscray, Victoria
Royal Australian Air Force personnel of World War II
Australian Army personnel of World War II
Military personnel from Melbourne